A cusp is the most pointed end of a curve. It often refers to cusp (anatomy), a pointed structure on a tooth.

Cusp or CUSP may also refer to:

Mathematics
 Cusp (singularity), a singular point of a curve
 Cusp catastrophe, a branch of bifurcation theory in the study of dynamical systems
 Cusp form, in modular form theory
 Cusp neighborhood, a set of points near a cusp
 Cuspidal representation, a generalization of cusp forms in the theory of automorphic representations

Science and medicine
 Beach cusps, a pointed and regular arc pattern of the shoreline at the beach
 Behavioral cusp, a change in behavior with far-reaching consequences
 Caltech-USGS Seismic Processing, software for analyzing earthquake data
 Center for Urban Science and Progress, a graduate school of New York University focusing on urban informatics
 CubeSat for Solar Particles, a satellite launched in 2022
 Cusp (anatomy), a pointed structure on a tooth
 Cusps of heart valves, leaflets of a heart valve
 Nuclear cusp condition, in electron density

Other uses
 Cusp (astrology)
 Cusp (film), a 2021 American documentary following three teenage girls at the end of summer
 Cusp (novel), a 2005 science fiction story by Robert A. Metzger
 Cusp Conference, an annual gathering of thinkers, innovators, etc. from various fields
 Cusp generation, a name given to those born during the transitional years of two generations
 Concordia University, St. Paul